Vithkuqi script, also called Büthakukye or Beitha Kukju after the appellation applied to it by German Albanologist Johann Georg von Hahn, was an alphabetic script invented for writing the Albanian language between 1825 and 1845 by Albanian scholar Naum Veqilharxhi.

History 
Though the script is sometimes erroneously claimed to be named after its inventor, as in Carl Faulmann's Das Buch der Schrift, the script's name is derived from Vithkuq, a village in the Korçë region where Veqilharxhi was born.

The script never took hold because of its inventor's premature death and because of the prohibitive costs of cutting new type for the invented characters; nevertheless, a number of documents using the script were published in the late 19th century. The script was eventually overwhelmed by the Greek, Arabic and Latin scripts it had been designed to supplant, the latter becoming the official one in 1909. Other original scripts used for Albanian were the Elbasan script and the Todhri script of the 18th century. These scripts similarly failed to see prolonged widespread usage.

Description 
Vithkuqi script was specifically designed to be as religiously neutral as possible, avoiding the duplication of Greek, Latin, or Arabic characters. It had a near-perfect correspondence between letters and phonemes, but lacked characters for modern Albanian "gj", "rr", "xh", and "zh". Additionally, modern "b" and "h" were each represented by two characters- the lesser-used characters in each pair are transliterated as "bb" and "hh" below.

Typeface 
The books by Veqilharxhi were lithographed in Bucharest by George Venrich, as was recently discovered. Though the script was lithographed, in 1847 it was also cut for typographic use in Vienna, by the Austrian philologists and punchcutter Alois Auer. It was first used for a type specimen called  by the Imperial Printing Press (k.k. Hof- und Staatsdruckerei) in Vienna, under the direction of Auer. The same type was also used by Carl Faulmann in a different book a few years later. It is the first typeface to be cut for an original Albanian alphabet.

Unicode 

Vithkuqi script was added to the Unicode Standard in September 2021 with the release of version 14.0.

The Unicode block for Vithkuqi is U+10570–U+105BF:

See also 
 Todhri script
 Elbasan script
 Vellara script
 Albanian alphabet

References

Sources 

 Diringer, David. (1949). The Alphabet.
 Десницкая, Агния Васильевна. (1968). Албанский язык и его диалекты. Leningrad: Nauka.
 Десницкая, Агния Васильевна. (1987). Албанская литература и албанский язык. Leningrad: Nauka.
 Elsie, Robert. (1995). The Elbasan Gospel Manuscript (Anonimi i Elbasanit), 1761, and the struggle for an original Albanian alphabet.
 Faulmann, Karl. (1880). Das Buch der Schrift.
 Skendi, Stavro. 1960. The history of the Albanian alphabet: a case of complex cultural and political development. Südost-Forschungen: Internationale Zeitschrift für Geschichte, Kultur und Landeskunde Südosteuropas 19:263-284.
 Trix, Frances. 1997. Alphabet conflict in the Balkans: Albanian and the congress of Monastir. International Journal of the Sociology of Language 128:1-23.
 Veqilharxhi, Naum. (1845). Evëtori Shqip Fort i Shkurtër.

Albanian scripts
Alphabets
Obsolete writing systems
Constructed scripts